Llanfihangel Rhydithon is a community in the county of Powys, (Radnorshire) Wales, and is 56.1 miles (90.3 km) from Cardiff and 143.5 miles (231.0 km) from London. In 2011 the population of Llanfihangel Rhydithon was 228 with 6.7% of them able to speak Welsh.

The community includes the village of Dolau and also has many round barrows dating back to the Iron Age.

References

See also
List of localities in Wales by population

Communities in Powys